Rangwe Constituency is an electoral constituency in Kenya. It is one of eight constituencies in Homa Bay County.

Members of Parliament

Wards

References 

Constituencies in Homa Bay County
Constituencies in Nyanza Province